"Fallen Idol" is the third episode of the sixth season of the American situation comedy-series M*A*S*H (after the two-part "Fade Out, Fade In") and its 125th overall. The episode aired on CBS on September 27, 1977 and is the first episode where the character of Frank Burns does not play a part in (although Larry Linville, the actor who played Burns, left the series at the end of the fifth season, the character was used in "Fade Out, Fade In", where an unseen and unheard Frank was making a phone calls to the camp.

Plot
Radar O'Reilly is feeling down as he does not believe that he is a "hot lover" and wants to try to become one so he can attract the various nurses of the 4077th. He relays his concerns to Hawkeye Pierce and B.J. Hunnicutt in The Swamp, and Hawkeye suggests that Radar take a trip to Seoul and try to find a woman there. Radar initially does not want to, but Hawkeye keeps prodding him until he finally agrees. After getting approval, Radar leaves on a Jeep.

Later that day, the 4077th is once again inundated with wounded as it usually is. While performing triage outside the OR, Hawkeye is examining a wounded soldier's shoulder and turns him over to look at his chest. Suddenly, he realizes that the wounded soldier is Radar and calls B.J. over to help him. Hawkeye is instantly taken aback by what has happened to Radar and believes it that it is his fault that Radar is injured, saying that he sent Radar out into the middle of the fighting "on a date." After insisting on performing the surgery to save Radar, Hawkeye heads out to drink his guilt away but cannot as all he can talk about is how guilty he feels.

The next morning Hawkeye wakes up suffering from a hangover worse than he usually suffers from when drinking and is in no condition to operate. However, wounded arrive in the compound and Major Winchester insists that Hawkeye rise from his bed and perform his duties as chief surgeon over B.J.'s protests that Hawkeye be allowed to rest. Winchester says that the call was for "all personnel", which by definition includes Hawkeye, and that he should not be excused because of his condition. Once Colonel Potter discovers Hawkeye's condition he is not pleased, and things get worse when Hawkeye has to run out of the OR to vomit during an operation and Winchester has to finish.

After the session is done Potter lectures Hawkeye on his behavior, telling him that he relies on him in the operating room and that his conduct was as unprofessional as it has ever been. Hawkeye, still upset, promises not to do it again and leaves while many people suggest he go visit Radar in post-op. Although he does not want to, as he is ashamed of his conduct and still has not gotten rid of the guilt over Radar's injury, Hawkeye finally does go to see him. Radar, however, is not happy to see him at all and abruptly calls him "sir" when asking when he will be ready to go back to work.

Surprised that Radar was so formal in speaking to him, since he almost always referred to Hawkeye by his name, Hawkeye asks him why. Radar then tells Hawkeye that he heard what happened in the OR. Hawkeye explains why it happened and that he had been under stress. Radar dismisses his concerns, and again calls Hawkeye out for having to leave, saying that he let a lot of people down. Hawkeye, meanwhile, is growing more tense as the conversation continues and feels that Radar is holding him to a much higher standard of conduct than he would anyone else because of his position. When he tries to explain that he would have substituted for Winchester if something happened to him, Radar says that Hawkeye is admired and depended upon by most of the staff and to have entered the room as intoxicated as he was, he is sending the message that there is nothing to depend on.

Hawkeye then says to Radar:

After briefly attempting to leave the room, all of Hawkeye's anger and frustration finally boils over and he turns back to Radar, standing over him and dressing him down in front of the whole post-op ward:

After being subjected to the diatribe from the chief surgeon, Radar is reduced to tears. Hawkeye is snapped out of his rage by his surprise at Radar's crying and asks him to stop twice, the second time in a more desperate, pleading manner, before calling him a "ninny" and running out of the ward.

Heading back to the Swamp, Hawkeye tells B.J. what happened and that he could not believe what he was doing, saying that he was not being himself and that his overflowing frustration caused him to be "an angry man screaming at Radar". Shortly thereafter Father Mulcahy enters The Swamp, having just heard the news; the uncharacteristically infuriated Father yells at Hawkeye for his actions, not believing that he was ever capable of making Radar cry. Mulcahy is in fact so angry at Hawkeye that he takes his frustration out by kicking the stove in The Swamp, which only makes him feel worse as he walks away with a broken toe.

As if that were not enough, a furious Col. Potter comes by next, now unhappy that he has had to discipline Hawkeye twice in one day. While Potter has his say, Margaret Houlihan enters The Swamp to make her feelings known, but she is so angry that she keeps interrupting Potter, which frustrates him as he was not planning on having to share his anger with her.

Hawkeye eventually decides to apologize to Radar, who refuses to accept. Still remembering what Hawkeye said to him, Radar decides to give Hawkeye a taste of his own medicine.

Winchester is surprisingly supportive of Hawkeye's situation, as he explains he had been in a similar situations, where he felt he let down younger interns who looked up to him, so he knows how Hawkeye feels right now.

Later, Potter checks in on Radar and tries to broker a peace between his feuding comrades but Radar is unwilling at first. Later that night in Rosie's Bar, Hawkeye and Radar start to shoot the breeze before Hawkeye apologizes to Radar for his conduct and says that it is okay if he still wants to worship him as a hero. Radar says he would "just as soon not", but eventually the two make peace by trading drinks as Radar takes Hawkeye's beer while Hawkeye drinks Radar's Grape Nehi.

The episode closes with another unusually formal event involving Radar and Hawkeye. The Army has decided to award Radar the Purple Heart due to his injury, and Hawkeye presents it to him. After pinning in on him, Hawkeye gives a salute to the company clerk, something he rarely does and jokingly tells him not to get hurt again.

Notes
Although David Ogden Stiers officially became part of the cast at the beginning of the season, this is the first episode that his character of Charles Emerson Winchester III has been a full member of the 4077th; in "Fade Out, Fade In" he began the episode as a surgeon at Tokyo General Hospital. 
Hawkeye's presentation of the Purple Heart to Radar was later referenced in the episode "Good-Bye, Radar" which aired during season 8. While he is packing to go home, Radar finds the Purple Heart among his belongings and tells Klinger, his replacement as company clerk, that Hawkeye pinned it to him himself and that Hawkeye saluted him, saying "Hawkeye never salutes anybody."

References

M*A*S*H (season 6) episodes
1977 American television episodes
Television episodes directed by Alan Alda